Daniel Alexeyevich Sysoev (1974–2009) was a married Russian Orthodox priest, the rector of St. Thomas' church in southern Moscow and a prominent missionary.

He was killed in a Russian Orthodox Church by a masked gunman on November 19, 2009. Sysoev was known for his missionary activity, including among Russia's Muslim community, neo-Pagans, and Protestants. In December 2009, Sysoev's murder was claimed by a militant Islamic group based in the North Caucasus. According to a statement made by Russian Islamists and released on kavkazcenter.com,

 "One of our brothers who has never been to the Caucasian took up the oath of (former independent Chechen president Doku Umarov) and expressed his desire to execute the damned Sysoyev." 

Sysoev was born into a family of Soviet dissidents. His father was Alexei Sysoev, senior priest of St John the Theologian Cathedral in Yasenevo District.

Sysoev's sermons were published in a series of books. Explaining the teaching of the Orthodox Church, Sysoev used the term 'Uranopolitanism'.

Hieromonk Job Gumerov and many other faithful and clergy consider the murder of Sysoev to be a martyrdom. Many Orthodox Christians hold him in high esteem, venerating him in iconography, liturgy and prayer though he has not yet been formally canonized by an Orthodox synod.

237 priests and more than 1000 lay people were present at the burial service. Patriarch Kiril I also came to say farewell to Sysoev.

References

1974 births
2009 deaths
Russian Eastern Orthodox priests
Eastern Orthodox theologians
Eastern Orthodox missionaries
Eastern Orthodox writers
20th-century Eastern Orthodox clergy
Russian Christian missionaries
Assassinated Russian people
Deaths by firearm in Russia
Clergy from Moscow
Christian critics of Islam
21st-century Eastern Orthodox priests
20th-century Eastern Orthodox priests
Christian missionaries in Russia